Venezuela has submitted films for the Academy Award for Best International Feature Film since 1978. The award is handed out annually by the United States Academy of Motion Picture Arts and Sciences to a feature-length motion picture produced outside the United States that contains primarily non-English dialogue.

Venezuela has had thirty-one films accepted by AMPAS for Oscar consideration, but none have yet been nominated for an Academy Award. However, in 2014 the official submission The Liberator was included in the January shortlist along with nine other foreign submissions. In 2005, their official submission, 1888: El Extraordinario Viaje de Santa Isabel, did not arrive in time due to a dispute with a rival film, Secuestro Express.

Venezuelan submissions are selected annually by the Centro Nacional Autónomo de Cinematografía.

Submissions
The Academy of Motion Picture Arts and Sciences has invited the film industries of various countries to submit their best film for the Academy Award for Best Foreign Language Film since 1956. The Foreign Language Film Award Committee oversees the process and reviews all the submitted films. Following this, they vote via secret ballot to determine the five nominees for the award. Below is a list of the films that have been submitted by Venezuela for review by the Academy for the award by year and the respective Academy Awards ceremony.

Three Venezuelan directors have been selected multiple times. All Venezuelan submissions have been made in Spanish, apart from the 2015 entry, Gone with the River, which was spoken in Warao.

Notes

References 

Academy Award for Best Foreign Language Film
Lists of films by country of production
Venezuela
Academy Award